The Formicinae are a subfamily within the Formicidae containing ants of moderate evolutionary development.

Formicines retain some primitive features, such as the presence of cocoons around pupae, the presence of ocelli in workers, and little tendency toward reduction of palp or antennal segmentation in most species, except subterranean groups. Extreme modification of mandibles is rare, except in the genera Myrmoteras and Polyergus. However, some members show considerable evolutionary advancement in behaviors such as slave-making and symbiosis with root-feeding hemipterans. Finally, all formicines have very reduced stings and enlarged venom reservoirs, with the venom gland, specialized (uniquely among ants) for the production of formic acid.

All members of the Formicinae "have a one-segmented petiole in the form of a vertical scale".

Identification
Formicine ants have a single node-like or scale-like petiole (postpetiole entirely lacking) and the apex of the abdomen has a circular or U-shaped opening (the acidopore), usually fringed with hairs. A functional sting is absent, and defense is provided by the ejection of formic acid through the acidopore. If the acidopore is concealed by the pygidium and difficult to discern, then the antennal sockets are located well behind the posterior margin of the clypeus (cf. Dolichoderinae). In most formicines, the eyes are well developed (ocelli may also be present), the antennal insertions are not concealed by the frontal carinae, and the promesonotal suture is present and flexible.

Tribes and genera
The tribal structure of the Formicinae is not completely understood. This list follows the scheme at AntCat, but other schemes and names are used.

 Camponotini Forel, 1878
 Calomyrmex Emery, 1895
 Camponotus Mayr, 1861 – carpenter ants (global)
 †Chimaeromyrma Dlussky, 1988
 Colobopsis Mayr, 1861
 Dinomyrmex Ashmead, 1905
 Echinopla Smith, 1857
 Opisthopsis Dalla Torre, 1893
 Overbeckia Viehmeyer, 1916
 Polyrhachis Smith, 1857 (Asian, African tropics)
 †Pseudocamponotus Carpenter, 1930
 Formicini Latreille, 1809
 Alloformica Dlussky, 1969
 Bajcaridris Agosti, 1994
 Cataglyphis Foerster, 1850
 †Cataglyphoides Dlussky, 2008
 †Conoformica Dlussky, 2008
 Formica Linnaeus, 1758
 Iberoformica Tinaut, 1990
 Polyergus Latreille, 1804 – Amazon ants
 Proformica Ruzsky, 1902
 †Protoformica Dlussky, 1967
 Rossomyrmex Arnol'di, 1928
 Gesomyrmecini Ashmead, 1905
 Gesomyrmex Mayr, 1868
 †Prodimorphomyrmex Wheeler, 1915
 Santschiella Forel, 1916
 †Sicilomyrmex Wheeler, 1915
 Gigantiopini Ashmead, 1905
 Gigantiops Roger, 1863 (Neotropical)
 Lasiini Ashmead, 1905
 Acropyga Roger, 1862
 Anoplolepis Santschi, 1914
 Cladomyrma Wheeler, 1920
 †Glaphyromyrmex Wheeler, 1915
 Lasiophanes Emery, 1895
 Lasius Fabricius, 1804
 Myrmecocystus Wesmael, 1838
 Prolasius Forel, 1892
 Stigmacros Forel, 1905
 Teratomyrmex McAreavey, 1957
 Melophorini Forel, 1912
 Melophorus Lubbock, 1883 (Australian)
 Myrmecorhynchini Wheeler, 1917
 Myrmecorhynchus André, 1896
 Notoncus Emery, 1895
 Pseudonotoncus Clark, 1934
 Myrmelachistini
 Brachymyrmex Mayr, 1868
 Myrmelachista Roger, 1863
 Myrmoteratini Emery, 1895
 Myrmoteras Forel, 1893
 Notostigmatini Bolton, 2003
 Notostigma Emery, 1920
 Oecophyllini Emery, 1895
 Oecophylla Smith, 1860 – weaver ants
 Plagiolepidini Forel, 1886
 Agraulomyrmex Prins, 1983
 Aphomomyrmex Emery, 1899
 Bregmatomyrma Wheeler, 1929
 Euprenolepis Emery, 1906
 Lepisiota Santschi, 1926
 Nylanderia Emery, 1906
 Paraparatrechina Donisthorpe, 1947
 Paratrechina Motschoulsky, 1863 – crazy ants
 Petalomyrmex Snelling, 1979
 Plagiolepis Mayr, 1861
 Prenolepis Mayr, 1861
 Pseudolasius Emery, 1887
 Tapinolepis Emery, 1925
 Zatania LaPolla, Kallal & Brady, 2012
 incertae sedis
 †Attopsis Heer, 1850
 †Leucotaphus Donisthorpe, 1920
 †Liaoformica Hong, 2002
 †Longiformica Hong, 2002
 †Magnogasterites Hong, 2002
 †Orbicapitia  Hong, 2002
 †Ovalicapito Hong, 2002
 †Ovaligastrula Hong, 2002
 †Protrechina Wilson, 1985
 †Sinoformica Hong, 2002
 †Sinotenuicapito Hong, 2002
 †Wilsonia Hong, 2002

References

External links

 
Ant subfamilies
Taxa named by Amédée Louis Michel le Peletier